The plainfin grenadier (Ventrifossa divergens) is a species of rattail. This is a deep-water fish found at depths of up to 772 m. It has a wide distribution in the Indian and western Pacific Oceans.

This species reaches a length of 30 cm. As suggested by the common name, it has a uniformly dark first dorsal fin, lacking the contrasting blotch seen in many species in the genus. It also has a black margin to its snout.

References

A new species, Caelorinchus sheni, and 19 new records of grenadiers (Pisces: Gadiformes: Macrouridae) from Taiwan - CHIOU Mei-Luen ; SHAO Kwang-Tsao ; IWAMOTO Tomio

Macrouridae
Taxa named by Charles Henry Gilbert
Taxa named by Carl Leavitt Hubbs
Fish described in 1920